Coinage Act is a stock short title used for legislation in the United Kingdom and the United States related to coinage.

List

United Kingdom
 Coinage Act 1816, defined the value of pound sterling relative to gold 
 Coinage Offences Act 1861 (see List of Acts of the Parliament of the United Kingdom, 1860–1879#1861 (24 & 25 Vict.))
 Coinage Act 1870, stated the metric weights of British coins
 Coinage Act 1971, made provisions for decimalisation of the pound sterling
 Coinage (Measurement) Act 2011,  amended the Coinage Act 1971 to allow the method for measuring and confirming the weight of coins to be set by proclamation

United States
 Coinage Act of 1792, established the U.S. Mint and defined coinage standards; silver-to-gold ratio set at 15:1
 Coinage Act of 1834, altered the silver-to-gold ratio to 16:1 
 Coinage Act of 1849, created two new denominations of gold coins, $1 and $20
 Coinage Act of 1853, reduced the silver in half-dollar, quarter, dime, and half-dime coins; authorized a $3 gold coin
 Coinage Act of 1857, forbid use of foreign coins as legal tender, reduced the size of the cent, ended the half-cent coin
 Coinage Act of 1864, mandated that the inscription "In God We Trust" be placed on all coins minted as United States currency
 Coinage Act of 1873, made the U.S. Mint part of the Treasury Department; silver demonetized, three minor coins terminated
 Coinage Act of 1965, effectively ended the mintage of circulating silver coins

See also

 List of short titles
Coinage Offences Act

Lists of legislation by short title
Lists of United States federal legislation